Cyclanthaceae is a family of flowering plants.

Taxonomy
Earlier systems, such as the Cronquist system and the Takhtajan system, placed it as the sole family in the order Cyclanthales. In the classification system of Dahlgren the Cyclanthaceae were the sole family of the order Cyclanthales in the superorder Cyclanthiflorae (also called Cyclanthanae).

The APG system (1998) and the APG II system (2003) assign it to the order Pandanales in the clade monocots.
The family occurs in the neotropics and consists of 12 genera with a total of ca 230 known species (Christenhusz & Byng 2016 ).

Subdivision
Genera
Asplundia Harling
Carludovica Ruiz & Pav.
Chorigyne R.Erikss.
Cyclanthus Poit.
Dianthoveus Hammel & Wilder
Dicranopygium Harling
Evodianthus Oerst.
Ludovia Brongn.
Schultesiophytum Harling
Sphaeradenia Harling
Stelestylis Drude
Thoracocarpus Harling

Cultivation and uses
The family is probably best known for Carludovica palmata, the young leaves of which are made into Panama hats.

An unidentified species belonging to this family (possibly a Carludovica species) has been marketed as a houseplant in the United States under the name "Jungle Drum".

Carludovica divergens is added to some versions of the hallucinogenic drink Ayahuasca.

References

Bibliography

Cyclanthaceae in L. Watson and M. J. Dallwitz (1992 onwards), The families of flowering plants
 
NCBI Taxonomy Browser: Cyclanthaceae
CSDL, Texas: Cyclanthaceae

 
Monocot families